Alexandru Marky (5 August 1919 – 4 December 1969) was a Romanian football goalkeeper.

International career
Alexandru Marky played four matches at international level for Romania, including two at the 1948 Balkan Cup.

Honours
Flamura Roşie Arad
Divizia A: 1946–47, 1947–48, 1950
Cupa României: 1947–48

References

External links

1919 births
1969 deaths
Romanian footballers
Romania international footballers
Association football goalkeepers
Liga I players
Liga II players
Nemzeti Bajnokság I players
FC UTA Arad players
FC Brașov (1936) players
Romanian expatriate footballers
Expatriate footballers in Hungary
Expatriate sportspeople in Hungary
Romanian expatriates in Hungary
Romanian expatriate sportspeople in Hungary
Sportspeople from Arad, Romania